Marani (also Romanized as Maranī and Meranī; also known as Mīranī and Mirni) is a village in Vilkij-e Markazi Rural District, Vilkij District, Namin County, Ardabil Province, Iran. At the 2016 census, its population was 929, in 273 families.

References 

Towns and villages in Namin County